Taiyuan Station  may refer to:
 Taiyuan railway station (Shanxi), in Taiyuan, Shanxi, China
 Taiyuan East railway station
 Taiyuan South railway station
 Taiyuan railway station (Taiwan), in Taichung, Taiwan